Emre Karayel (born 18 October 1972) is a Turkish actor and TV presenter.

Life and career 
Emre Karayel was born on 18 October 1972 in Kadirli, a district of Osmaniye. After completing high school at Ankara Atatürk Anatolian High School, he entered Gazi University, School of Economics and Administrative Sciences, Department of Economics. Without completing his studies there, he transferred to Bilkent University, School of Music and Performing Arts, Theatre Department. After graduating from university in 1999, Karayel started working at TRT, hosted and prepared children's programs.

Karayel, who stepped into his professional acting career in 2000 with the TV series Ablam Böyle İstedi, which was broadcast on TRT, continued his career by appearing in the series Kuzenlerim in 2002, and later portrayed the character of "Zekeriya" the 2003 TV series Bir İstanbul Masalı, which brought him fame. He starred in many TV series such as Gümüş, Kurtlar Vadisi Pusu, and Canım Ailem.

Karayel made his cinematic debut with Police, which was directed by Onur Ünlü and released in 2006. It was followed by Zincirbozan in 2007, Usta in 2008 and Başka Dilde Aşk in 2009. In the same year, he acted in the short film Ezber, directed by Tolga Öztor to emphasize the violence against stray animals.

Besides his appearances in cinema and on television, Karayel has taken part in plays as Testosterone, Othello, Ghetto, and Azizname. He was awarded the Most Successful Musical or Comedy Actor of the Year in a Supporting Role at the 13th Afife Theatre Awards for his performance in the play Testosterone staged by Oyun Atölyesi.

Karayel shared the leading role with Demet Evgar on Fox's 1 Erkek 1 Kadın 2 Çocuk series, which came to an end in 2015. In 2017, he began presenting the game show Sıradaki Gelsin on Fox, followed by Çarkıfelek on Kanal D between 2018 and 2020.

Karayel has also been a principal member of the Jockey Club of Turkey since 2020 and has race horses. One of them, Yiğit Kardeş, came first in the race on behalf of the 10th Ottoman sultan Suleiman the Magnificent at the Veliefendi Race Course on 16 October 2022. The thoroughbred Arabian horse named "Yiğit Kardeş" earned him ₺1.7 million.

Theatre

Filmography

Television

Film

Web

TV programs 
 2008 - 19th International Ankara Film Festival (with Dolunay Soysert)
 2011 - Bul Bakalım
 2014 - Akıl Kârı
 2015 - Sesi Çok Güzel
 2017 - Sıradaki Gelsin
 2018 - 25th International Adana Film Festival (with Burcu Esmersoy)
 2018–2020 - Çarkıfelek

Awards 
 2009 - 13th Afife Theatre Awards - Most Successful Musical or Comedy Actor of the Year in a Supporting Role - Testosterone

References

External links 
 
 
 

1972 births
Living people
21st-century Turkish male actors
Turkish male film actors
Turkish male stage actors
Turkish male television actors
Turkish television presenters
People from Kadirli